Edward Emilio Barleycorn  (1891–1978) was a member of one of the prominent Fernandino families of Spanish Guinea (today Equatorial Guinea). In 1928, at the age of 39, he negotiated a labor contract between African farmers of Santa Isabel and the Spanish leaders of Fernando Po (Bioko).

He farmed his father's lands in places like Achepepe and Bantabare, employing relatives like his godmother and aunt Amelia Vivour.

References

1891 births
1978 deaths
Fernandino people
Equatoguinean politicians